Rosario is a feminine given name in Spanish, and a masculine given name in Italian. It may refer to:

People
 Rosario Bourdon, Canadian musician
 Rosario Candela, Italian-born American architect
 Rosario Castellanos, Mexican poet
 Rosario Dawson, American actress
 Rosario DeSimone, Italian mobster
 Rosario Di Bella, Italian composer and singer-songwriter
 Rosario Francesco Esposito, Italian Roman Catholic priest
 Rosario Fernández, Peruvian politician, Prime Minister of Peru
 Rosario Flores, Spanish singer and actress
 Rosario Gambino, Italian mobster
 Rosario Hernández Diéguez, Spanish newspaper hawker and trade unionist
 Rosario La Spina, Australian tenor
 Rosario Maceo, Italian mobster
 Rosario Marin, United States Treasurer
 Rosario Nadal, Princess of Preslav, Spanish art director
 Rosario Prieto, actress from the Dominican Republic
 Rosario Robles, Mexican politician
 Rosario Sánchez, Mexican race walker
 Rosario Silva de Lapuerta, Spanish judge in Luxembourg

Fictional people
 Rosario, character from the manga Dragon Half
 Rosario + Vampire, a manga about a human living at a monster high school
 Rosario "Pol" Blancanales, a character from The Executioner (book series) universe
 Rosario Salazar, a character on the American television sitcom Will & Grace

See also
 Rosaria (given name)

Italian masculine given names
Spanish feminine given names